Lodeyka is a rural locality (a village) in and the administrative center of Nizhneyerogodskoye Rural Settlement, Velikoustyugsky District, Vologda Oblast, Russia. The population was 258 as of 2002.

Geography 
Lodeyka is located 41 km southwest of Veliky Ustyug (the district's administrative centre) by road. Vypolzovo is the nearest rural locality.

References 

Rural localities in Velikoustyugsky District